Mauro Bergonzini (born 7 July 1912 in Modena) was an Italian football player.

Honours
 Coppa Italia winner: 1937–38.

External links

1912 births
Year of death missing
Italian footballers
Serie A players
Cosenza Calcio 1914 players
Juventus F.C. players
U.S. Salernitana 1919 players
Association football midfielders